Bhojudih is a railway station on the Adra–Netaji S.C.Bose Gomoh branch line, just south of the Damodar River and links to Sudamdih, north of the Damodar, and on the Railways in Jharia Coalfield. It is located in Bokaro district in the Indian state of Jharkhand. This Station is an important hub for freight train operation in South Eastern Railway. Proper examination an maintenance work of railway wagons are done at this station. Freight trains with good quality wagons are assemble here and dispatched to various sidings of Jharia Coalfield for loading and transportation of coal in various parts of India.

History
The Bengal Nagpur Railway extended its then mainline, the Nagpur–Asansol line, to Netaji S.C.Bose Gomoh, on East Indian Railway's main line, in 1907. The Mohuda–Chandrapura branch line was opened in 1913. The Kharagpur–Gomoh section of BNR was opened up to Bhojudih in February 1903.

Electrification
The Anara–Rukni–Santaldih and Santaldih–Pathardih–Sudamdih–Jamadoba sectors were electrified in 1965–66.

Passenger movement
Bhojudih railway station serves around 2000 passengers every day.

Inspectors Group of Bhojudih 
Bhojudih Railway station is managed by a group ofsupervisors, popularly known as "Inspectors Group of Bhojudih".
This Group includes the following members:-
Ratan Sahay- Ch.DTI- Supervisor of Operating Department, C.M.Jha- Supervisor of Signal Department, Shishupal Ahirwar-Supervisor of Engineering Department,
R.K.Jha- Supervisor of Traction Department, Arup Basu- Supervisor of Wagon repair and maintenance Department,  S.Dutta- Officer In-charge of Railway Protection Force, S.Mudi-Supervisor of Works Department, Rajiv Kumar- Supervisor of Telecom Department, Dipak Maji- Supervisor of Electric Department.

References

External links
 Trains at Bhojudih

Railway stations in Bokaro district
Adra railway division